Ageratina cuencana is a species of flowering plant in the family Asteraceae. It is endemic to Ecuador. Its natural habitats are subtropical or tropical moist montane forests and subtropical or tropical high-altitude shrubland. It is threatened by habitat loss.

Etymology
Ageratina is derived from Greek meaning "un-aging", in reference to the flowers keeping their color for a long time. This name was used by Dioscorides for a number of different plants.

References

cuencana
Flora of Ecuador
Vulnerable plants
Plants described in 1918
Taxonomy articles created by Polbot